The Škoda 14 T (also called Porsche and Elektra) is a five carbody section uni-directional low-floor tram, developed by Škoda Transportation for the Prague tram system.

The vehicle's body was designed by Porsche Design Group.  The 14 T has six axles, and the low-floor area represents 50% of the entire vehicle floor. Due to specific Prague conditions it is able to deal with difficult adhesive conditions on grades up to 8.5%. It is based on the Škoda 05 T.

Production 
: 3 trams were produced and delivered to Prague. Prague has ordered 20 vehicles with an option for another 40.

: There are about 40 trams delivered to Prague.

: The order has been completed in March with a total of 60 trams delivered.

Accidents 
On September 19, 2011, the two-car set ČKD Tatra T6A5 crashed in high speed to Škoda 14 T standing at the tram stop. All three vehicles were decommissioned and accident left one fatality, the driver of Tatra T6A5. Investigation shown that driver's health problems were most likely to cause the accident.

See also 
 Predecessor: Škoda 05 T - "Vektra"
 Successor: Škoda 15 T - "ForCity"
 Related Elektra models: 13 T (Brno), 16 T (Wrocław uni-directional), 19 T (Wrocław bi-directional)

External links 

 Information on Škoda webpages

Tram vehicles of the Czech Republic
Škoda trams

de:Škoda Elektra#14T für Prag